Cláudio Mortari (born March 15, 1948) is a Brazilian former professional basketball player and basketball coach.

Playing career
Mortari played club basketball with the Brazilian club Palmeiras.

Coaching career
Mortari has coached numerous club teams in his career, such as Palmeiras, Sírio, Pinheiros, and several other clubs. He has won several championships in his coaching career. He was also the coach of the senior men's Brazilian national basketball team at the 1980 Summer Olympic Games.

Awards and accomplishments

Coaching career
5× Brazilian Championship Champion: (1977, 1978, 1979, 1983, 1995)
3× South American Club Championship Champion: (1978, 1979, 1995)
FIBA Intercontinental Cup Champion: (1979)
FIBA Americas League Champion: (2013)

References

External links
Pinheiros Coach Profile 

1948 births
Living people
Brazilian basketball coaches
Brazilian men's basketball players
Esporte Clube Pinheiros basketball coaches
Sociedade Esportiva Palmeiras basketball coaches
Sociedade Esportiva Palmeiras basketball players
Esporte Clube Sírio basketball coaches
Sport Club Corinthians Paulista basketball coaches
Basketball players from São Paulo